Izhma Airport  was an airport in Komi, Russia located 3 km northeast of Izhma. It formerly handled small aircraft (An-2, An-24, L-410, Yak-40, etc.) but was closed to airliners in 2003 and is now only used for helicopters.

Accidents and incidents

References

Airports built in the Soviet Union
Airports in the Komi Republic